This page is a list of British army-level formations existing during the First World War.

Expeditionary Forces
 British Expeditionary Force (BEF)
 First Army
 Second Army
 Third Army
 Fourth Army
 Fifth Army (originally the Reserve Army)
 Mediterranean Expeditionary Force (MEF)
 Dardanelles Army
 Egyptian Expeditionary Force (EEF)
 British Salonika Army (BSF)
 Mesopotamian Expeditionary Force
 British Force in Italy

Home Forces
 Central Force
 First Army
 Second Army
 Third Army
 Northern Army
 Southern Army

References
 Maj A.F. Becke,History of the Great War: Order of Battle of Divisions, Part 4: The Army Council, GHQs, Armies, and Corps 1914–1918, London: HM Stationery Office, 1944/Uckfield: Naval & Military Press, 2007, .

British Armies
War